The Mandubii (Gaulish: *Mandubioi) were a small Gallic tribe dwelling near their chief town Alesia, in modern Côte-d'Or, during the Iron Age and the Roman period.

Name 
An oppidum Mandubiorum is mentioned by Caesar (mid-1st c. BC), and the tribe is designated as Mandoubíōn (Μανδουβίων) by Strabo (early 1st c. AD).

The ethnonym Mandubii is a latinized form of Gaulish *Mandubioi (sing. *Mandubios). It is generally seen as stemming from the root mandu- ('pony'). Alternatively, Pierre-Yves Lambert has proposed to compare the name with the Welsh mathru ('trample upon'). The second element may be related to the second element of the vulgar Latin vidubium 'billhook' (a loan from Gaulish) and mean 'beaters' or 'strikers'.

Geography 
The territory of the Mandubii was located in the Haux-Aixois region, between the settlements of Alesia in the north, Blessey in the east, Braux in the west, and Sombernon in the southeast. During the reign of the Roman emperor Augustus, their small territory was incorporated into the Lingonian territory. In the unstable period following the death of Nero in 68 AD, the Mandubii were excluded from the Lingonian territory and attached to the Aedui.

History 
Mandubian ceramics are attested in Villaines-les-Prévôtes by the 2nd century BC. While under the influence of the neighbouring and more powerful Aedui and Lingones, the Mandubii benefited from a relative autonomy (at least economic and cultural) before the Roman conquest.

References

Bibliography 

 
 
 
 
 

Historical Celtic peoples
Gauls
Tribes of pre-Roman Gaul